This is a list of prime ministers of Jordan since 1921.

List of officeholders

See also
List of kings of Jordan

References

Government of Jordan
 
Jordan, List of prime ministers of
Prime Ministers